WXZC (104.3 FM) is a commercial radio station licensed to Inglis, Florida, and covering much of Citrus County, Florida. The station is currently owned by the Citrus County Association For Retarded Citizens, which also owns and operates Class A TV station WYKE-CD.  Sales and programming for the station are being handled by WGUL-FM, Inc. under a local marketing agreement (LMA).

WXZC airs a country music radio format, simulcast from 103.3 WXCZ in Cedar Key, Florida, which is also owned by WGUL-FM, Inc.  The two stations call themselves "Nature Coast Country."

History
The station was granted a construction permit as WABU on 1993-05-28. On 1993-06-25, the station changed its call sign to WAVQ, and signed on the air during the summer of 1996. On 1998-05-16, the call letters were changed to WHGN, on 2000-10-11 to WIFL, on 2010-07-22 to WOGF, and on 2011-07-25 to WYKE. It has broadcast numerous music and talk formats, under such brands as "Wow 104.3", "Extreme Talk Radio 104.3", "Frank 104.3", and "Frank Talk 104.3".

For a period in 2011, it was silent, before coming under its current ownership. In November 2011, WYKE was granted a construction permit to upgrade to Class C3 and boost its effective radiated power to 19,000 watts.  In the early 2010s, the station was a Fox Sports Radio Network affiliate.  It was also an affiliate of the USF Bulls football network for the 2011 season.  WYKE was later a CBS Sports Radio affiliate.

On April 13, 2018, it was announced that WYKE's programming and sales would be taken over by WGUL-FM, Inc. under a three-year local marketing agreement (LMA), with the option to purchase the station outright. The station flipped to a country music format on April 15, 2018.  It changed its call sign to WXZC on April 18, 2018.

Previous logo

References

External links

Station history from Central Florida Radio enthusiasts

XZC
Radio stations established in 1993
1993 establishments in Florida
Country radio stations in the United States